Harold Millington (24 April 1875 – 25 October 1951) was an Australian politician. He was a Labor Party member of the Parliament of Western Australia; as a member of the Legislative Council for North-East Province for six years from 1914, and as a member of the Legislative Assembly from 1924 to 1947, representing the electorates of Leederville (1924–1930) and Mount Hawthorn (1930–1947). He was a long-serving state minister in the governments of Philip Collier and John Willcock, and was Deputy Premier under Willcock.

Millington was born in Gawler, South Australia, and moved to Western Australia in 1894. He was a miner by trade and became active in various unions in Goldfields.  He became the first president of the Amalgamated Surface Workers' Union and the secretary of the Eastern Goldfields District Council of the Labor Party. He was elected to the Legislative Council for North-East Province in a 1914 by-election and served in that house until his defeat in 1920. He subsequently served as secretary to the state executive of the Labor Party.

Millington contested and won the inner metropolitan electorate of Leederville at the 1924 election, and was promoted to Cabinet as Minister for Agriculture in 1927. His Leederville electorate was divided into two in a redistribution in 1930, and Millington contested and won the new Mount Hawthorn seat. He served, variously, as minister for education, police, industries, works, water supply, local government, town planning and main roads, under both Collier and his successor Willcock. In 1939, Millington was elected deputy Labor leader and Deputy Premier under Willcock. In December 1943, he retired from the deputy role and the ministry citing ill health, and served out his final term on the backbench before retiring at the 1947 election.

He died at St John of God Subiaco Hospital in 1951, four days after being admitted for heart problems. He was survived by his widow and their three sons. He was buried at Karrakatta Cemetery.

References

See also

 Second Collier Ministry
 Willcock Ministry

1875 births
1951 deaths
People from Gawler, South Australia
Deputy Premiers of Western Australia
Members of the Western Australian Legislative Assembly
Members of the Western Australian Legislative Council
Australian miners
Burials at Karrakatta Cemetery